The New Zealand men's national water polo team is the representative for New Zealand in international men's water polo.

The team placed 5th at the 2014 Commonwealth Water Polo Championships in Aberdeen, Scotland.

Results

World Championship
1982 – 16th place
1991 – 16th place
1994 – 16th place
1998 – 16th place
2007 – 15th place
2013 – 16th place
2019 – 16th place

FINA World League
 2008 – Asia/Oceania round

Current roster
Roster for the 2019 World Championships.

Head coach: Davor Carevic

References

External links
Official website

Men's national water polo teams
 
Men's sport in New Zealand